is a Japanese manga series written and illustrated by Ren Kawahara. The series was serialized in Kodansha's Shōnen Magazine Edge magazine from October 2015 to December 2018, and was compiled into eight tankōbon volumes. The manga is licensed in North America by Kodansha USA, who began releasing the manga digitally in English in September 2018. A sequel manga was launched in January 2019, and an anime television series adaptation by Silver Link aired from April 6 to June 22, 2019.

Plot
Back when she was in kindergarten, Ao Horie shared a short essay about herself, which she soon regrets, because of her father, Hanasaki Horie, who is an author of erotic novels. Ao aims to go to an elite university to finally get away from her father, but soon she meets Takumi Kijima in their first year in high school. Ao can't think of a way to avoid Takumi and constantly thinks of them being with each other as a couple. Ao believes her father has influenced her way of thinking.

Characters

Ao is a high school girl who tries not to associate with any of her classmates, especially boys, because her father is an erotic novelist. She is a top student academically, and aspires some day to live somewhere far away. She has a negative view of boys and sex, thinking they are all perverts and wolves, until Takumi Kijima wanted to be friends with her. Ao cannot seem to avoid him and often gets into embarrassing situations with Takumi. She later develops feelings for him.

 Ao's classmate in high school is a popular guy. He has a crush on Ao and is thrilled when Ao inadvertently makes the first move in wanting to be friends with him. He occasionally points out embarrassing situations with Ao, even though she tries to ignore it at first.

 Ao's father, a well-known erotic novelist. His major works are Promiscuous Lament and 100 Words of Significance in Bed. He likes to intervene in Ao's social life. His character resembles Happosai from the Ranma ½ manga. 

 Miyabi is an old classmate of Ao from kindergarten. She has a crush on Takumi, but she doesn't get why he likes Ao.

 Souichiro is the editor for Hanasaki's novels.

 Masaki is one of Takumi's friends.

 Shuhei is one of Takumi's friends.

Media

Manga
Ao-chan Can't Study!, written and illustrated by Ren Kawahara, was serialized in Kodansha's Shōnen Magazine Edge magazine from October 2015 to December 2018. Kodansha USA has licensed the manga in North America, which has been releasing the manga digitally in English since September 2018. It was compiled into eight tankōbon volumes. A sequel manga began serialization in January 2019.

Ao-chan Can't Study!: Adult Arc

Anime
An anime television series adaptation was announced on December 4, 2018. The series is animated by Silver Link and directed by Keisuke Inoue, with Michiko Yokote handled series composition, and Miwa Oshima designed the characters. It aired from April 6 to June 22, 2019 on the Animeism programming block on MBS, TBS, and BS-TBS. Edoga Sullivan performed the series' opening theme song "Wonderful Wonder", while Spira Spica performed the series' ending theme song . Sentai Filmworks has licensed the series for international regions, excluding Asia; an English dub was produced. In Southeast Asia and South Asia, Muse Communication streamed the series on its Muse Asia YouTube channel.

Notes

References

External links
 
 

2019 anime television series debuts
Anime series based on manga
Animeism
Kodansha manga
Muse Communication
Sentai Filmworks
Shōnen manga
Silver Link